Allen v Flood [1898] AC 1 is a leading case in English tort law and UK labour law on intentionally inflicted economic loss.

Facts
A trade union official told an employer his members would not work alongside the claimants. The employer was pressured to get rid of the claimants. For the loss of work, the claimants sued the trade union official. An important fact is that all the workers in the case were only hired day by day. Therefore, the trade union official had never threatened a breach of contract because the contracts began afresh with a new day's work.

Judgment

High Court
Kennedy J presided over the trial where the jury found that the plaintiffs had suffered damage to the extent of £20 each, and assessed the damage accordingly.

Court of Appeal
Lord Esher MR, Lopes LJ and Rigby LJ held that the action was maintainable against the district delegate.

House of Lords
The House of Lords held by a majority (Lord Watson, Lord Herschell, Lord Macnaghten, Lord Shand, Lord Davey, and Lord James) that even though there was a malicious motive, this could not render the conduct unlawful, because the effect actually complained of (not rehiring) was in itself entirely lawful.

As one of those invited to give an opinion, Cave J said the following.

Giving the last judgment, Lord Davey said the following.

Lord Halsbury LC, Lord Ashbourne and Lord Morris dissented.

Significance
Allen v Flood has come under criticism in some quarters. In another leading tort case in the context of union strike action, Rookes v Barnard, Lord Devlin expressed disapproval. However Allen v. Flood was approved by the House of Lords in the recent case of OBG v Allan.

Allen v Flood also held that the earlier economic tort case of Keeble v Hickeringill was just a nuisance case, and not an economic torts case.

See also
Labour law
Contract law

Notes

English tort case law
United Kingdom labour case law
House of Lords cases
1898 in case law
1898 in British law
United Kingdom trade union case law